DOD, Dod and DoD may refer to:

People
 Dod (surname)
 Dod (nickname)

Government
 Department of Defense
 United States Department of Defense

Science and technology
 Depth of discharge,  a measure of how much energy has drained from a battery
 Direct Outward Dialing, in telephony
 DOD Electronics, an electronics company that makes effects pedals for musicians
 DrinkOrDie, a software-cracking and warez-trading network
 Definition of Done, exit criteria used in the Scrum software development process
 Drop-on-demand, a printing technology
 Displacement on demand, or Active Fuel Management, an automobile variable displacement technology
Definition of Default, an ECB standard to measure the risk of a counterparty not fulfilling its obligation, especially to repay loans or credits.

Music and film
 D.O.D. (album), by the rap group Do or Die
 D.O.D. (DJ) (Dan O'Donnell), a British DJ and record producer
 D.O.D. Festival, a heavy metal festival in Co. Laois, Ireland
 Do or Die (disambiguation) refers to many groups, songs, albums and films
 "D.O.D." (Drink Or Die), a song from the album Hide Your Face by Japanese musician Hide

Games
 Day of Defeat, a first-person shooter multiplayer game developed by Valve
 Drakar och Demoner, the Swedish roleplaying game by Target Games
 Dawn of Discovery (disambiguation), American name of several video games
 Drag-On Dragoon, the Japanese name of the Drakengard series

Other uses
 IATA airport code for Dodoma Airport
 Date of death
 Arabic letter Ḍād ض

See also
 Dodd (disambiguation)
 Dods (disambiguation)
 Dodds (disambiguation)
 Dodi (disambiguation)